Philip McDonald is an English recording studio audio engineer, best known as the engineer for EMI and later for Apple Records during the Beatles' studio years, along with Geoff Emerick and others. McDonald joined Apple as a senior balance engineer, at the age of 25. Aside from his work on Beatles albums, he was responsible for engineering on recordings by John Lennon, George Harrison, the Shadows, Paul McCartney, Ringo Starr, Roy Harper, Badfinger, Rhead Brothers, Roger Daltrey, and Squeeze.

References

Bibliography
 Dan Matovina, Without You: The Tragic Story of Badfinger, 2nd ed., illustrated, revised, Frances Glover Books, 2000,  

Living people
English audio engineers
Year of birth missing (living people)